Mediterranean Style House may refer to:

 Mediterranean Style House (116 Walnut Street, Nogales, Arizona), listed on the National Register of Historic Places listings in Santa Cruz County, Arizona
 Mediterranean Style House (124 Walnut Street, Nogales, Arizona), listed on the National Register of Historic Places listings in Santa Cruz County, Arizona
 Mediterranean Revival architecture, a design style popular in the early twentieth century